Bonghwa is a town, or eup in Bonghwa County, North Gyeongsang Province, South Korea. The township Bonghwa-myeon was upgraded to the town Bonghwa-eup in 1979. Bonghwa County Office and Bonghwa Town Office are located in Naeseong-ri, which is crowded with people.

Communities
Bonghwa-eup is divided into 10 villages (ri).

References

External links
Official website 

Bonghwa County
Towns and townships in North Gyeongsang Province